Robert J. Lynn (born August 26, 1949) served as the 36th Chief Justice of the New Hampshire Supreme Court. He was sworn in on April 9, 2018. Immediately prior he served as an associate justice of the New Hampshire Supreme Court, nominated by Governor John Lynch in 2010. From 1992 to 2010, he served as a justice on the New Hampshire Superior Court. He graduated from University of Connecticut School of Law in 1975. In 2020, Lynn was elected to the New Hampshire House of Representatives.

References

External links

1964 births
21st-century American judges
Chief Justices of the New Hampshire Supreme Court
Justices of the New Hampshire Supreme Court
Living people
New Hampshire Republicans
Place of birth missing (living people)
Superior court judges in the United States
University of Connecticut School of Law alumni
University of New Haven alumni